W6 may refer to:

 W6 (tram), a class of electric trams built by the Melbourne & Metropolitan Tramways Board.
 a particular width for a structural steel I-beam
 a postcode district in the W postcode area
 Wizz Air (IATA code W6)
 7th step of the W0-W6 scale for the classification of meteorites by weathering
 W6 (loading gauge) on the British rail network
 Weltmeister W6, a Chinese car